Kentucky Route 1295 (KY 1295) is an  state highway in Kentucky that runs from Kentucky Route 52 immediately southwest of Hyattsville to Kentucky Route 52 again southwest of Richmond. It serves Hyattsville and Kirksville. It is mainly used as a time saver for traffic between Richmond and Lancaster. It is notorious among locals as being a very dangerous highway as many accidents have occurred on that highway. It is known as Moran Mill Road in Madison County, and Kirksville Road in Garrard County.

Major intersections

References

1295
Transportation in Garrard County, Kentucky
Transportation in Madison County, Kentucky